Gabriella Pizzolato (born 1 January 1958) is a former Italian long jumper and heptathlete, who won three national championships at individual senior level from 1981 to 1985 in two different specialities.

Biography
Her best result on the international senior level was the final reached in the long jump at the 1985 European Athletics Indoor Championships held in Athens.

At the end of the 2018 indoor season her 6.41 resists the 8th place in the Italian top ten all-time long jump indoor.

National record
 Long jump: 6.41 m (Turin, 3 February 1985). Record was equaled by Antonella Capriotti on 22 January 1986, and broken on 21 January 1987 with 6.57.

Achievements

National titles
Italian Athletics Championships
Heptathlon: 1981
Italian Athletics Indoor Championships
Long jump: 1982, 1985

References

External links

1958 births
Living people
Italian female long jumpers
Italian heptathletes
Athletes from Rome
20th-century Italian women